Stefan Campagnolo (born 13 March 1969) is a former French French footballer, who was playing for Elite 3000 Fodbold.

Career
His former clubs include Lyngby Boldklub, HIK, Fremad Amager and Frem.

Notes

1969 births
Living people
French footballers
Boldklubben Frem players
Lyngby Boldklub players
Association football goalkeepers